Vincenzo Bernardo (born May 22, 1990) is a former American soccer player. After his career, he founded Morris Elite SC, which currently competes in USL League Two.

Career

Club
Bernardo grew up in New Jersey, moving to Italy at age sixteen to pursue his professional soccer career. Prior to moving to Italy he played for the MetroStars U-17 and U-19 Teams. He joined Napoli in 2006 playing for the Napoli primavera squad. With Napoli Bernardo was primarily deployed as an attacking midfielder or as a second striker.

After leaving Napoli, Bernardo went on trial with several Major League Soccer clubs. He eventually signed with Austrian club FC Höchst in January 2011. After a successful stay in Austria, Bernardo returned to the United States signing with Harrisburg City Islanders, where he had a brief stay. In 2012 Bernardo would move abroad once again, this time to Guatemala with Deportivo Guastatoya. In his one season at the club Bernardo impressed scoring 12 goals in 35 matches.

For the 2014 season Bernardo returned to the United States signing with NPSL side Miami United FC. He appeared in 12 matches for the team scoring 7 goals. The following season he signed with Miami Fusion FC, being the first player to sign for the club.

International
Bernardo has also been involved with the United States national team since the U-15 level, and has played for the United States U-17 and United States U-20 national team. He has denied rumors that he is interested in following Giuseppe Rossi in playing for Italy, stressing his desire to "become an important player for [the U.S.] in the future."

References

1990 births
Living people
American soccer players
American expatriate soccer players
People from Morristown, New Jersey
Soccer players from New Jersey
Sportspeople from Morris County, New Jersey
American expatriates in Italy
S.S.C. Napoli players
Penn FC players
United States men's youth international soccer players
United States men's under-20 international soccer players
Association football forwards
Association football midfielders